Kevin Steen (born May 7, 1984) is a Canadian professional wrestler. He is currently signed to WWE, where he performs on the Raw brand under the ring name Kevin Owens.

Steen began his career in 2000, at the age of 16. Prior to joining WWE in late 2014, he wrestled under his birth name for Ring of Honor (ROH), where he held the ROH World Championship and ROH World Tag Team Championship. He also wrestled extensively on the independent circuit for 14 years, most notably in Pro Wrestling Guerrilla (PWG), where he held the PWG World Championship a record three times, as well as the PWG World Tag Team Championship on three occasions. Steen also competed for International Wrestling Syndicate (IWS), where he held three times the IWS World Heavyweight Championship, All American Wrestling (AAW), where he held the AAW Heavyweight Championship; and Combat Zone Wrestling (CZW), where he held the CZW Iron Man Championship.

Steen signed with WWE in August 2014, and joined their developmental branch NXT, where he held the NXT Championship once, before debuting with the belt on the main roster in May 2015. In WWE, he has held the Universal Championship once, the Intercontinental Championship twice, and the United States Championship three times. He also headlined the first night of WrestleMania 38, in which he wrestled "Stone Cold" Steve Austin in a one-off match 19 years after Austin's retirement. Overall, he is a six-time world champion in professional wrestling.

Early life 
Kevin Steen was born on May 7, 1984, in Saint-Jean-sur-Richelieu, Quebec, and raised in Marieville, Quebec, 18 miles east of Montreal. He has a brother named Edward Lower. He is of French-Canadian and Irish descent and speaks French as his first language. He learned to speak English by mimicking everything he heard while watching WWF Monday Night Raw. Steen participated in ice hockey, soccer, and baseball, but never considered developing a career out of them—especially soccer, after suffering an injury at age 11—and instead considered becoming a professional wrestler after he and his father watched a videotape of the match between Diesel and Shawn Michaels at WrestleMania XI.

Professional wrestling career

Early career (2000–2004) 
When Steen was 14, his parents allowed him to start training with Serge Jodoin, a wrestler based in Quebec. The following year, Steen began training with Jacques Rougeau. He also trained with Terry Taylor, whom he has called his "main trainer". Steen had his first match on May 7, 2000 (his 16th birthday) in L'Assomption, Quebec. Steen trained with Rougeau and wrestled for Rougeau's promotion for four years, before beginning to wrestle with several other Canadian promotions.

International Wrestling Syndicate (2003–2009) 
On August 16, 2003, Steen made his International Wrestling Syndicate (IWS) debut at Born to Bleed. Pierre Carl Ouellet defeated El Generico and Steen at Blood, Sweat and Beers in a triple threat match on October 18, 2003. On November 15 at Payback's A Bitch, El Generico defeated Steen in their first-ever singles match against each other. IWS held its 5th anniversary show "V" on June 15, 2004 at Le SPAG, where El Generico defeated PCO in an IWS title match to win his first IWS World Heavyweight Championship, only to have Steen cash in his #1 contendership won earlier that night against Excess 69. Steen defeated El Generico, also winning his first IWS World Heavyweight Championship. Steen's first title reign in 2004, marked a pivotal milestone in the history of the promotion when he became the first IWS World Heavyweight Champion to internationally defend the title, in defeating Roderick Strong on October 30 in Rahway, New Jersey for Jersey All Pro Wrestling (JAPW).

On September 22, 2007 at Blood, Sweat & Beers, Steen defeated Jay Briscoe. On February 16, 2008 at Violent Valentine, El Generico defeated Steen for the IWS World Heavyweight Championship. On March 22, 2008 at Know Your Enemies, Steen regained the IWS World Heavyweight Championship by defeating Max Boyer & former champion El Generico in a 3-Way match. On May 24, 2008 at Freedom to Fight, Steen became the first-ever to hold two IWS titles simultaneously when he defeated Max Boyer to win the IWS Canadian Championship in an IWS Championship Unification match.

Combat Zone Wrestling (2004–2006, 2008, 2014) 

Steen made his Combat Zone Wrestling (CZW) debut on September 10, 2004, at High Stakes II, where SeXXXy Eddy defeated Steen, El Generico & Excess 69 in an IWS 4-Way Match, which was unofficially chosen as "CZW Match of the Year". 

On May 14, 2005, Steen took part in the "CZW Best of the Best tournament" and he advanced to the finals after defeating Kenny The Bastard in the first round and Chris Hero in the second round. He was unable to clench the trophy, however, as he lost in the finals in a fatal four-way match involving B-Boy, Super Dragon, and Mike Quackenbush. 

A few months later in August, Steen defeated Franky The Mobster to win the CZW Iron Man Championship. He went on to defend the championship in individual matches against Nate Webb, El Generico, Chris Sabin, and Super Dragon. In a steel cage match held at CZW Trapped involving The Canadians, The Blackout, The Forefathers of CZW, and Eddie Kingston, Steen lost the Ironman Championship to female wrestler LuFisto. He lost the championship one day shy of having a year-long reign. He then departed for a tour with Dragon Gate, and did not return to CZW until February 2008 when he made a one-time appearance and fought Vordell Walker to a no contest.

Steen returned to CZW six years later, competing in two matches for the promotion in 2014. Steen first was defeated by Japanese competitor Masato Tanaka before defeating D. J. Hyde twenty-two days later at an event in Rhode Island.

Pro Wrestling Guerrilla (2005–2008) 
While wrestling in CZW, Steen also began working for Pro Wrestling Guerrilla (PWG). On May 13, 2005, at Jason Takes PWG, Steen was entered into his first feud in PWG, when he helped Excalibur defeat Super Dragon in a Guerrilla Warfare match, in the process revealing himself as the fake Super Dragon, who had been attacking the real one the past few months. On August 6, 2005, Steen won the PWG Championship after defeating A.J. Styles at Zombies [Shouldn't Run]. Steen held the title for nearly four months before losing the championship to Joey Ryan at Chanukah Chaos (The C's Are Silent), following interference from Super Dragon. Steen's feud with Super Dragon ended on December 16, 2005, at Astonishing X-Mas, where he was defeated in a Guerrilla Warfare match.

In 2006, Steen began teaming with El Generico, and they began to pursue the PWG World Tag Team Championship. On July 29, 2007, at Giant-Size Annual No. #4, Steen and Generico defeated the reigning champions PAC and Roderick Strong to become the PWG World Tag Team Champions. They successfully defended the belts for almost three months before ultimately losing them to the team of Davey Richards and Super Dragon on October 27 in England as part of PWG's "European Vacation II" tour. The next night, Steen teamed with PAC in an attempt to regain the belts from Dragon and Richards, announcing before the match that if he lost, he'd leave the company indefinitely. Steen and PAC lost, leading to Steen leaving PWG.

However, Steen returned to PWG and, along with El Generico, won the title for a second time, this time from The Dynasty (Joey Ryan and Scott Lost) on March 21, 2008, in an impromptu match. Steen and Generico became the first team in PWG history to be a part of the annual Dynamite Duumvirate Tag Team Title Tournament to defend the belts in each match they had. In the tournament finals, they lost the title to Jack Evans and Roderick Strong, thus ending their second reign. Ultimately, Steen left PWG after interest from ROH increased. According to Steen, he could not wrestle for ROH and PWG at the same time and chose ROH because of the money and the exposure.

Ring of Honor

Storyline with El Generico (2007–2010)

On February 17, 2007, Steen returned to Ring of Honor, teaming with El Generico in a losing effort to the Briscoe Brothers. On April 14, Mark Briscoe returned in the middle of a match between Steen and Generico and his brother Jay and Erick Stevens. Mark was attacked by the duo, however, and was pinned by Steen after a package piledriver. On May 11, Steen (as a heel) and Generico (as a face) defeated Jason Blade and Eddie Edwards. At Respect is Earned on July 1, Steen and El Generico defeated The Irish Airborne (Jake and Dave Crist), Pelle Primeau and Mitch Franklin, and Jimmy Rave and Adam Pearce in a Tag Team Scramble dark match. That same night, Steen and El Generico brawled with the Briscoe Brothers, ending with Mark Briscoe suffering a mild concussion from a steel chair shot. At Driven on September 21, the Briscoe Brothers defeated Steen and El Generico to retain the ROH World Tag Team Championship. Steen and Generico suffered three consecutive losses to the Briscoes at Caged Rage on August 24 in a Steel Cage match, Manhattan Mayhem II on August 25 in a two out of three falls match, and Man Up on November 30 in a ladder match. Their only tag team win over the Briscoes was at Death Before Dishonor V Night 1 in a non-title Boston Street Fight.

On June 6, 2008, Steen and Generico participated in a one night tournament to crown new ROH World Tag Team Champions, defeating Go Shiozaki and ROH World Champion Nigel McGuinness in the first round, Chris Hero and Adam Pearce in the second round, but losing to Jimmy Jacobs and Tyler Black in the finals. On July 25, Steen faced off against ROH World Champion Nigel McGuinness in a title match for the company's debut show in Toronto, Ontario, Canada, but Steen lost the match. At a pay-per-view taping in Boston on September 19, Steen and Generico beat The Age of the Fall to finally win the ROH World Tag Team Championship. This also fulfilled Steen's promise of winning a title in ROH before the November 21 Dayton show. They lost the championship to The American Wolves (Eddie Edwards and Davey Richards) at a television taping on April 10, 2009.

On December 19 at Final Battle, ROH's first live pay-per-view, after a loss to The Young Bucks, Steen turned heel by attacking his tag team partner El Generico. Steen then found a new partner in Steve Corino. At the following pay-per-view, The Big Bang! on April 3, 2010, Generico and Cabana defeated Steen and Corino via disqualification, when Steen used a chair on his former partner. On June 19 at Death Before Dishonor VIII, Steen defeated El Generico in a singles match. On September 11 at Glory By Honor IX, Generico and Cabana defeated Steen and Corino in a Double Chain match, when Cabana forced Corino to tap out. After the match Steen attacked El Generico and unmasked him. On December 18 at Final Battle, Steen and Generico ended their year–long feud in an unsanctioned Fight Without Honor, where Steen put his ROH career on the line against Generico's mask. However, Steen did not like the idea, because he would lose money if he lost, but in the end he agreed to the match, because he thought ROH would use Generico as a top wrestler after the feud. In the end El Generico won the match and thus forced Steen out of ROH. The feud was voted by Wrestling Observer Newsletter as the best feud of the year.

Prior to the outcome, on November 4, Kevin Steen's contract agreement with Ring of Honor ended due to financial budget concerns, which ultimately played a role within the stipulations of the match. Steen wrote most of the El Generico rivalry storyline himself, though he claims that his poor relationship with new booker Jim Cornette, who had little interest in either Steen or Generico, resulted in a great deal of frustration for him. During the feud, ROH booker Adam Pearce promised Steen he would main event Final Battle, but Cornette made Davey Richards-Eddie Edwards the main event and Steen-Generico after the event. Steen also claims that Cornette "froze" him out of ROH, believing he was also keeping the promotion's president Cary Silkin in the dark on when Steen would be brought back.

ROH World Champion (2011–2013) 

When Steen was pulled out of ROH events, ROH President Cary Silkin paid him every month. Cornette told Steen he would be brought back a few months later, so Steen lost , but when ROH was sold, Cornette told him to wait another six months. His contract expired in February 2011. After signing a new contract with the promotion, Steen returned to Ring of Honor on June 26, 2011, at Best in the World, being introduced by Corino, who had turned face shortly after Steen's departure from the promotion and claimed that he needed redemption as well. However, ROH officials forced him to leave the arena before he could show that he was a changed man. After Corino was defeated by Michael Elgin, Steen ran in to save him from a beatdown at the hands of the House of Truth, but ended up turning on him and his sponsor Jimmy Jacobs. Afterwards, Steen was dragged out of the arena, while Jim Cornette swore that he would never again wrestle for ROH. The original idea was to introduce Steen as a rehab wrestler. However, Steen turned down the idea, because he did not "want to look like The Bravado Brothers". Though Steen was booked as the heel of the storyline, the fans took his side and instead booed Cornette. The storyline continued on July 22, when Steen invaded ROH's official message board, writing posts praising Pro Wrestling Guerrilla. On September 15, ROH's message board was "hacked" to redirect to a video, where Steen announced his intention of attending ROH's Death Before Dishonor IX the following weekend.

At the event on September 17, Steen interrupted a match between El Generico and Jimmy Jacobs and called out Steve Corino, who was at the time wrestling in Japan, before powerbombing Jacobs on the ring apron. Steen was then confronted by Jim Cornette and ROH president Cary Silkin, whom he tried to Package Piledrive, before being ushered out of the arena by the security. On the November 5 episode of Ring of Honor Wrestling, Steen reappeared with Ohio Valley Wrestling talent Christian Mascagni as his legal adviser, threatening Jim Cornette and Ring of Honor with legal action unless he was reinstated within three weeks. On the December 3 episode of Ring of Honor Wrestling, Steen was granted a match with Steve Corino at Final Battle, with his ROH future on the line. At the event on December 23, Steen defeated Corino, thus granting back his career in ROH. Afterwards, he delivered a package piledriver to Jimmy Jacobs, before putting El Generico through a table with the same maneuver. At the end of the evening, he confronted Davey Richards and promised to become the ROH World Champion in 2012. On March 4, 2012, at the 10th Anniversary Show, Steen defeated Jimmy Jacobs in a No Holds Barred match and ended the pay-per-view by having another confrontation with Davey Richards. Steen continued his win streak during the Showdown in the Sun weekend, first defeating El Generico, with help from Jimmy Jacobs, in a Last Man Standing match on March 30 and then Eddie Edwards in a singles match on March 31. On May 12 at Border Wars, Steen defeated Davey Richards to win the ROH World Championship for the first time, making him the first Canadian to hold the championship.

Following the match, Steve Corino entered the ring and hugged Steen and Jacobs; the three men went on to form a stable later named S.C.U.M. (Suffering, Chaos, Ugliness, and Mayhem). Steen made his first successful title defense on June 15, defeating Eddie Edwards. On June 24 at Best in the World 2012: Hostage Crisis, Steen defeated Davey Richards to retain the ROH World Championship. At the following pay-per-view, Boiling Point on August 11, Steen successfully defended his title against Chikara Grand Champion Eddie Kingston. On September 15 at Death Before Dishonor X: State of Emergency, Steen made another successful title defense against Rhino. On October 6, a title match between Steen and Jay Lethal ended in a no contest in Lethal's home state of New Jersey, after which Steen spat at Lethal's parents, who were sitting at ringside. Seven days later at the following internet pay-per-view, Glory By Honor XI: The Unbreakable Hope, Steen made a successful title defense against Michael Elgin. Afterwards, Steen was delivered a box, which contained El Generico's mask. On December 16 at Final Battle 2012: Doomsday, Steen successfully defended the ROH World Championship against the returning El Generico in a ladder match. On March 2, 2013, at the 11th Anniversary Show, Steen defeated Jay Lethal in a grudge match to retain the ROH World Championship. On April 5 at Supercard of Honor VII, Steen lost the ROH World Championship to Jay Briscoe.

Final feuds (2013–2014) 
At the following night's tapings of Ring of Honor Wrestling, S.C.U.M. turned on Steen, with Corino announcing that he would not be seen in ROH again. Steen, however, returned to ROH on May 4, now working as a face and replacing Jay Lethal in a tag team match, where he and Michael Elgin faced S.C.U.M.'s Cliff Compton and Jimmy Jacobs. The match ended with Jacobs pinning Steen for the win, after which Elgin walked out on him. Steen continued his rivalry with S.C.U.M. on June 22 at Best in the World 2013, where he was defeated by Matt Hardy in a No Disqualification match. The following day, Steen replaced The Briscoes due to injuries in a Steel Cage Warfare match and forced his former stable out of ROH, despite interference from Corino and Hardy, when he pinned Jimmy Jacobs to win the match and disband S.C.U.M. On August 3, Steen entered a tournament for the vacant ROH World Championship, defeating Brian Kendrick in his first round match. On August 17, Steen advanced to the semifinals of the tournament with a win over Roderick Strong.On September 20 at Death Before Dishonor XI, Steen was eliminated from the tournament by Michael Elgin. Following the tournament, Steen started feuding with Michael Bennett. The two faced off on October 26 at Glory By Honor XII, where Bennett was victorious, following a distraction from his girlfriend Maria Kanellis. On December 14 at Final Battle 2013, Steen defeated Bennett in a Stretcher match, where the loser would be forced to stop using the piledriver. On February 8, 2014, Steen earned a shot at the ROH World Championship by defeating Jay Lethal, Michael Elgin and Tommaso Ciampa in a four-way number one contender's match.

Steen received his title match on May 10 in Toronto at Global Wars, but was defeated by the defending champion, Adam Cole. After losing to Shinsuke Nakamura at the Ring of Honor/New Japan Pro-Wrestling co-produced War of the Worlds iPPV on May 17, Steen announced he was leaving ROH. This led to him being insulted and attacked by Silas Young. After defeating Young on June 22 at Best in the World 2014, Steen announced that his contract was up in a "month and a half". At the July 19 Ring of Honor Wrestling tapings, Steen defeated Steve Corino in his final ROH match.

Return to PWG (2010–2014) 
When Steen left ROH in 2010, his friend Super Dragon asked him to wrestle in PWG and Steen agreed. On December 11, 2010, Steen wrestled Akira Tozawa for his first PWG win in two years. He then returned to a more prominent role in the company after a few sporadic years, having only made five appearances between 2009 and 2010. On January 29, 2011, Steen was defeated by Chris Hero at PWG's annual WrestleReunion-sponsored event. Later that evening, after a four-way tag team match to determine which of four teams would enter the 2011 DDT4 tournament, Steen ran out to attack the eventual winners, the RockNES Monsters (Johnny Goodtime and Johnny Yuma), before declaring his intention of winning the DDT4 tournament. On February 2, 2011, it was announced that Steen would be teaming with Akira Tozawa for the tournament, which took place on March 4. In their first round match, Steen and Tozawa, known collectively as the Nightmare Violence Connection, scored an upset victory over the Briscoe Brothers (Jay and Mark Briscoe). After another upset victory over the ROH World Tag Team Champions, Kings of Wrestling (Chris Hero and Claudio Castagnoli), Steen and Tozawa made it to the finals of the tournament, where they were defeated by The Young Bucks (Matt and Nick Jackson). On July 23 at PWG's eighth anniversary show, Steen first defeated PAC in a singles match, before teaming with CIMA to defeat PWG World Tag Team Champions, The Young Bucks, in a non-title match. After Claudio Castagnoli had defeated Chris Hero in the main event of the evening to retain the PWG World Championship, Steen challenged him to a match and, in his third match of the night, defeated him to win the PWG World Championship for the second time. At the following event on August 20, Steen entered the 2011 Battle of Los Angeles, defeating Dave Finlay and Eddie Edwards in his first round and semifinal matches. Later that same night, Steen was defeated in the finals by old rival El Generico. On September 10, Steen made his first PWG World Championship defense, defeating former champion Davey Richards.

On October 22, Steen lost the PWG World Championship to El Generico in a ladder match, following interference from The Young Bucks. After the match Super Dragon made his first appearance in over three years by saving Steen with the two accepting The Young Bucks' challenge for a Guerrilla Warfare match. On December 10, Steen and Dragon, known collectively as "Appetite for Destruction", defeated The Young Bucks in a Guerrilla Warfare match to win the PWG World Tag Team Championship. On March 17, Steen defeated El Generico and Eddie Edwards in a three-way match to win the PWG World Championship for the third time. Steen made his first title defense on April 21, defeating Sami Callihan in an open challenge. On May 25, Steen successfully defended the PWG World Championship against Brian Cage-Taylor. That same night, Steen and Dragon were stripped of the PWG World Tag Team Championship, after Dragon was sidelined with a heel fracture. On July 21 at Threemendous III, PWG's ninth anniversary event, Steen made his third successful defense of the PWG World Championship against Willie Mack. On September 1, Steen was eliminated from the 2012 Battle of Los Angeles in the first round by Ricochet, following a distraction from Brian Cage. After having his championship belt stolen from him by the 2012 Battle of Los Angeles winner Adam Cole, Steen successfully defended the title in a three-way match against Michael Elgin and Ricochet on October 27, after which he challenged Cole to a match for December 1. On December 1, Steen lost the PWG World Championship to Adam Cole in a Guerrilla Warfare match.

After El Generico had agreed to a deal with WWE, he and Steen reunited one more time on January 12, 2013, by entering the 2013 Dynamite Duumvirate Tag Team Title Tournament. After wins over the Briscoe Brothers and Future Shock (Adam Cole and Kyle O'Reilly), they were defeated in the finals of the tournament by The Young Bucks. On August 31, at the 2013 Battle of Los Angeles, Steen turned heel and formed a new stable named The Mount Rushmore of Wrestling with PWG World Champion Adam Cole and PWG World Tag Team Champions The Young Bucks. On July 26, 2014, Steen was defeated by Trevor Lee in his PWG farewell match.

WWE

NXT Champion (2014–2015) 
On August 12, 2014, WWE announced that Steen had signed with them and was due to report to their developmental system NXT on August 25. His new ring name had only the surname changed to Owens, a tribute to his son Owen (who himself is named after Owen Hart), and NXT began airing promotional videos from November 20 to hype his upcoming debut. Owens detailed that he had wrestled for 14 years before making it to WWE, having faced (and formed friendships with) several current WWE or NXT wrestlers on the independent circuit years ago, but WWE signed them first—he declared that despite these friendships he would now fight anyone and everyone because fighting was the best way he could provide for his family.

At NXT TakeOver: R Evolution on December 11, Owens defeated CJ Parker in his debut match, in which Parker legitimately gave him a broken nose with a Third Eye (palm strike); later that night, when Sami Zayn (the former El Generico) won the NXT Championship, Owens came to the ring to congratulate Zayn before attacking him with a powerbomb onto the ring apron, establishing himself as a heel in the process. On the December 18 episode of NXT, Owens wrestled former NXT Champion Adrian Neville to a double countout and powerbombed Neville onto the apron after the match. After yet another post-match attack by Owens on Zayn, an irate Zayn demanded a match against Owens, but Owens refused to wrestle unless it was for the championship—Zayn agreed and a title match was set for NXT TakeOver: Rival. At the event on February 11, 2015, two months to the day after his debut, Owens captured the championship from Zayn via referee stoppage after repeatedly powerbombing a disorientated Zayn. On the March 25 episode of NXT, he successfully retained the NXT title against Finn Bálor. At NXT TakeOver: Unstoppable on May 20, Owens' rematch for the title against Zayn went to a no contest after Owens continued to beat down an injured Zayn, until the debuting Samoa Joe stopped him. After weeks of tension between the two, Owens faced Joe on the June 17 episode of NXT. After the match went to a no contest, the two continued to brawl until they had to be separated.

On the July 4 WWE Network special, The Beast in the East event held in Tokyo, Owens lost the NXT Championship to Bálor, ending his reign at 143 days. At NXT TakeOver: Brooklyn on August 22, Owens had his rematch for the title in a ladder match against Bálor, but he failed to regain the title in his last match and appearance in NXT. While on the main roster as NXT Champion, Owens successfully defended the title against Zack Ryder during an NXT Championship open challenge on the June 4 episode of SmackDown, against Neville on the June 8 episode of Raw and against Heath Slater on the June 12 episode of Main Event.

Intercontinental Champion (2015–2016) 

Owens made his unannounced main roster debut on the May 18 episode of Raw, responding to John Cena's United States Championship open challenge. However, instead of competing in the match, he attacked Cena and stomped on the United States title in a show of disrespect, setting up a non-title match between the two at Elimination Chamber on May 31, which Owens won cleanly by pinfall. A rematch between the two took place at Money in the Bank on June 14, which Cena won, and after the match, Owens powerbombed Cena onto the ring apron. Owens later challenged Cena to a match for the United States Championship, which took place at Battleground on July 19, which Cena won by submission, thus ending their feud. After the loss to Cena, Owens entered a feud with Cesaro, defeating him in two matches—at SummerSlam on August 23 and on an episode of Raw eight days later.

On September 20 at Night of Champions, Owens defeated Ryback to win his first singles title on the main roster, the Intercontinental Championship. On October 3, Owens' first title defense came on the WWE Network special, Live from Madison Square Garden, where Owens defeated Chris Jericho. On October 25, at Hell in a Cell, Owens successfully defended the championship in a rematch against Ryback. Owens then took part in the tournament for the vacant WWE World Heavyweight Championship, in which he defeated Titus O'Neil and Neville, but lost to Dean Ambrose in the semifinals at Survivor Series on November 22. Owens then entered a feud with Ambrose, where he lost the Intercontinental Championship to Ambrose at TLC: Tables, Ladders & Chairs on December 13, ending his reign at 84 days. Going into 2016, Owens unsuccessfully faced Ambrose for the championship on several occasions. On January 24, Owens entered the 2016 Royal Rumble match at the Royal Rumble pay-per-view, but was unsuccessful after being eliminated by Sami Zayn.

The following night on Raw, Owens entered a feud with Dolph Ziggler, with the two trading victories over each other on back to back episodes of Raw. On the February 15 episode of Raw, Owens won the Intercontinental Championship for a second time, defeating former champion Dean Ambrose, Stardust, Tyler Breeze and Ziggler in a fatal five-way match. At Fastlane on February 21, Owens successfully defended the Intercontinental Championship against Ziggler. At WrestleMania 32 on April 3, Owens lost the title against Zack Ryder in a seven-way ladder match. He resumed the feud with longtime rival Sami Zayn after he attacked him on Raw, which led to a match at Payback on May 1, where Owens defeated Zayn. At Extreme Rules on May 22, Owens faced Zayn, Cesaro and Miz in a fatal four-way match for the Intercontinental Championship, but failed to regain the title when Miz pinned Cesaro. The following night on Raw, Owens defeated AJ Styles to qualify for the 2016 Money in the Bank ladder match, but he failed to win the match at the event on June 19.

Universal Champion (2016–2017) 

During the 2016 WWE draft, Owens was drafted to Raw. At Battleground on July 24, Owens was defeated by Zayn. At SummerSlam on August 21, Owens teamed with Chris Jericho to defeat Enzo Amore and Big Cass. On the August 22 episode of Raw, Owens defeated Neville to qualify for the vacant Universal Championship fatal four-way elimination match the following week. On the August 29 episode of Raw, Owens defeated Big Cass, Roman Reigns and Seth Rollins after interference from Triple H to win the Universal Championship, his first world title in WWE. Between September and October, Owens successfully defended the title against Rollins, first in a singles match at Clash of Champions on September 25, and then at Hell in a Cell in a Hell in a Cell match on October 30, both times after interferences from Jericho. Owens and Jericho were later announced as co-captains of Team Raw for the traditional Survivor Series match against Team SmackDown, alongside Braun Strowman, Roman Reigns and Seth Rollins at Survivor Series on November 20. At the event, Team SmackDown would emerge victorious.

The following night on Raw, Owens defeated Rollins in a No Disqualification match to retain the championship once again following the interference of Jericho, WWE United States Champion Reigns issued a challenge to Owens, who stated that he did not need Jericho's help against him, and Owens suffered his first pinfall loss since becoming champion after losing a non-title match to Reigns that same night, thus earning Reigns a WWE Universal Championship match against Owens at Roadblock: End of the Line. At the event on December 18, after failing to help Jericho defeat Rollins, Owens retained the championship by disqualification when Jericho intentionally attacked him with a Codebreaker. This led to Reigns' rematch at the Royal Rumble pay-per-view event being under the stipulation that would see Jericho (who would pin Reigns in a handicap match involving Owens, to win the United States Championship on the January 9, 2017 episode of Raw) being suspended above the ring in a shark proof cage. On January 29 at the Royal Rumble event, Owens defeated Reigns in a No Disqualification match after Braun Strowman interfered. The following night on Raw, Owens defended the title against Strowman (who revealed that he helped Owens retain the WWE Universal Championship because of his dislike for Reigns and because Owens had promised him a title shot) and once again retained the title after Reigns attacked both him and Strowman. On the February 6 episode of Raw, Owens was challenged by Goldberg to a championship match at Fastlane, which Jericho accepted on Owens' behalf, much to his dismay. On the February 13 episode of Raw, Jericho hosted a "Festival of Friendship" for Owens, who was not impressed with Jericho's idea of humour and instead then presented Jericho with a new list as a gift, but when Jericho realized that it was "The List of KO" and that he was the first name on it, Owens turned on Jericho and viciously attacked him. At Fastlane on March 5, Owens lost the title to Goldberg in 22 seconds after a distraction from Jericho, thus ending his championship reign at 188 days.

United States Champion and teaming with Sami Zayn (2017–2019) 
The following night on Raw, Owens accepted Jericho's challenge for a match at WrestleMania 33 on April 2 as long as Jericho would defend the United States Championship, which Owens won for the first time in his career. On the April 11 episode of SmackDown Live, Owens was traded to the SmackDown brand as part of the 2017 WWE Superstar Shake-up. Owens, who would still defend his newly won title against Jericho at Payback with the winner going to SmackDown as well, started referring to himself as the "Face of America" and also began sporting a different look, having trimmed his beard and hair down, while wearing a suit. At Payback on April 30, Owens lost the title back to Jericho, thus ending his reign at 28 days. However, Owens reclaimed the title on the May 2 episode of SmackDown Live by defeating Jericho, and then attacking and injuring him after the match as well. At Backlash on May 21, Owens defeated AJ Styles by count-out to retain the United States Championship. Owens was later announced as one of the participants in Money in the Bank ladder match at Money in the Bank on June 18, along with Sami Zayn, Shinsuke Nakamura, Styles, Dolph Ziggler and Baron Corbin, in which Corbin emerged victorious.

During a house show at Madison Square Garden on July 7, Owens lost the United States Championship to Styles ending his second reign at 66 days, but regained it at Battleground on July 23 and lost it back to Styles two days later on SmackDown in a triple threat match also involving the returning Chris Jericho. The following week, Owens received a rematch, where Styles retained after the referee did not see Owens' shoulder up, due to being accidentally struck by Owens earlier in the match. After the match, Owens demanded a rematch with a competent official. SmackDown Live General Manager Daniel Bryan then made a match between Owens and Styles for the United States Championship at SummerSlam, with Commissioner Shane McMahon as the special guest referee. During that time, Owens dropped the Face of America gimmick and reverted to the Prizefighter persona, shedding both the suits, America-orientated promos and his pursuit of the United States Championship. At SummerSlam on August 20, Owens was defeated by Styles, in a match where both wrestlers argued with Shane over his decisions. On the August 22 episode of SmackDown Live, Owens demanded another rematch which Shane allowed, with Baron Corbin as the special guest referee, but was once again unsuccessful, after Corbin walked out on the match and Shane took over, distracting Owens enough for Styles to capitalize and win. This also meant that as long as Styles held the title, Owens could not challenge Styles for the title again, ending his feud with Styles.

On the September 5 episode of SmackDown Live, Owens demanded another shot at the United States Championship; when Shane refused, Owens insulted Shane's children, which caused him to attack Owens. As a result, Shane was suspended and Bryan announced that Mr. McMahon would be on SmackDown Live the following week. At Hell in a Cell on October 8, Owens defeated Shane in a Hell in a Cell match after interference from Zayn, who turned heel to push Owens off the announce table as Shane attempted a Leap of Faith off the cell. On the following episode of SmackDown Live, Zayn then referred to Owens as his "brother", after revealing why he helped Owens rather than allow Shane to win. At Survivor Series on November 19, Owens and Zayn attacked Shane McMahon during the main event, which backfired after McMahon attacked both with a steel chair and Orton delivered an RKO to Owens. At Clash of Champions on December 17, Owens and Zayn defeated Orton and Shinsuke Nakamura in a tag team match with their jobs on the line and with McMahon and Bryan as special guest referees, after Bryan gave them a fast count. Going into 2018, both would compete for AJ Styles's WWE Championship; first in a handicap match at Royal Rumble on January 28 and secondly at Fastlane on March 11, where they competed in six-pack challenge that also involved Dolph Ziggler, Baron Corbin and John Cena, but were unsuccessful both times. After that, they continued their feud against Bryan and McMahon, culminating in a tag team match at WrestleMania 34 on April 8, where Bryan made his in-ring return, being defeated after Bryan submitted Zayn. The night after WrestleMania 34, Owens, now a free agent, showed up on Raw along with Zayn and asked Raw General Manager Kurt Angle for a job. Though reluctant, Angle made a match between Owens and Zayn where whoever won the match and would receive a Raw contract, but the match ended in a no contest and Owens and Zayn remained free agents. This decision was overruled the following week, as both men would be awarded Raw contracts by Raw Commissioner Stephanie McMahon. On the May 7 episode of Raw, he lost a Money in the Bank qualifying match to Braun Strowman. At Backlash on May 6, Owens and Zayn were defeated by Strowman and Lashley. On the May 14 episode of Raw, he was given another opportunity to qualify for the Money in the Bank ladder match on June 17, which he won by defeating Lashley and Elias in a triple threat match. At the event, the ladder match was won by Braun Strowman.

In the following weeks, Owens unsuccessfully attempted to develop a partnership with Strowman to replace an injured Sami Zayn, leading to Strowman destroying Owens' car. At Extreme Rules on July 15, Owens defeated Strowman after he threw Owens from the top of the cage through the announce table, meaning Owens' feet touched the floor first, rendering him the winner. On the July 23 episode of Raw, Raw Commissioner Stephanie McMahon granted Kevin Owens an opportunity to face Strowman at SummerSlam under the stipulation that if Owens won, he received Strowman's Money in the Bank contract. At the event on August 19, Owens lost to Strowman. On the August 27 episode of Raw, after failing to win the Intercontinental Championship from Seth Rollins, Owens sat in the middle of the ring and said the words "I Quit." On the September 3 episode of Raw, Owens returned to attack Bobby Lashley. At Super Show-Down on October 6, in what was originally set to be a singles match between Owens and Cena, he instead teamed with Elias in a losing effort against Lashley and Cena, and on the following episode of Raw, Owens was defeated by Lashley. The next day, WWE announced Owens suffered injuries to both knees that required surgery.

On the February 26, 2019 episode of SmackDown Live, Owens returned as a face, replacing Kofi Kingston in the WWE Championship match at Fastlane against Daniel Bryan, per Vince McMahon's orders. At the pay-per view on March 10, a returning Mustafa Ali was added to the match, thus making it a triple threat match, and Owens failed to win the title after Bryan pinned Ali. After WrestleMania 35, Owens started a storyline, where he congratulated Kofi Kingston for winning the WWE Championship and joined The New Day as their honorary third member, since Big E was recovering from an injury. However, since Daniel Bryan suffered an injury at WrestleMania, SmackDown needed a top level heel, so on the April 23 episode of SmackDown Live, Owens turned on Kingston and attacked him and Xavier Woods, proclaiming that he wanted the WWE Championship, thus turning him back into a heel. Owens challenged Kingston for the WWE Championship at Money in the Bank on May 19 in a losing effort. At Stomping Grounds on June 23, Owens teamed with Sami Zayn to defeat Big E and Xavier Woods.

Various feuds (2019–2022)
On the July 2 episode of SmackDown Live, Owens questioned Shane McMahon's decisions and underhanded tactics before they were interrupted by Dolph Ziggler, leading to McMahon booking them in a tag team match which they lost after a miscommunication. The following week, Owens stated his distaste in McMahon's constant dominance on television, before fleeing as McMahon called for security. Later that night, Owens interfered in Ziggler's match against Roman Reigns and hit McMahon with a stunner, turning face once again. At Extreme Rules on July 14, Owens defeated Ziggler in 17 seconds. At Smackville on July 27, Owens defeated Elias, one of McMahon's allies. At SummerSlam on August 11, Owens defeated McMahon in a match where had Owens lost, he would be fired. Owens was then announced as a participant in the King of the Ring tournament, losing to Elias in the first round, where McMahon served as the special guest referee. On the September 10 episode of SmackDown Live, McMahon fired Owens, after McMahon tapped out to Chad Gable in their King of the Ring semi-final match, where Owens was serving as the special guest referee. The following week, Owens attended the show as an audience member, but had also filed a kayfabe wrongful termination lawsuit against McMahon. On October 4 during the 20th Anniversary of SmackDown, Owens defeated McMahon in a ladder match with both men's careers on the line. As per the pre-match stipulation, McMahon was fired from WWE.

On October 11, Owens moved back to the Raw brand as part of the draft. On November 23 at NXT TakeOver: WarGames, Owens made a one-off appearance as Tommaso Ciampa's mystery fourth partner for the WarGames match against The Undisputed Era (Adam Cole, Bobby Fish, Kyle O'Reilly, and Roderick Strong), where Team Ciampa ultimately emerged victorious. At Survivor Series on November 24, Owens made up part of Team Raw in a losing effort to Team SmackDown also involving Team NXT. The next night on Raw, Owens would began a feud with Seth Rollins, and would be targeted in attacks by Rollins and his allies AOP (Akam and Rezar). Owens entered the Royal Rumble match on January 26, 2020 at #27, but was eliminated by Rollins. Rollins then challenged Owens to a match at WrestleMania 36, which was won by Owens to end their feud. On the pre-show at The Horror Show at Extreme Rules on July 19, Owens defeated Murphy, an ally of Rollins. After this, Owens entered into a program with Aleister Black. After a number of matches against each other, Owens defeated Black on the October 12 episode of Raw to end their feud. 

As part of the 2020 Draft in October, Owens was drafted to the SmackDown brand. He defeated Dolph Ziggler on the October 30 episode of SmackDown to qualify for Team SmackDown at Survivor Series. At the event on November 22, Team SmackDown lost in a clean sweep by Team Raw. Owens then reignited his rivalry against Roman Reigns, challenging him for the Universal Championship at TLC on December 20, and again at Royal Rumble on January 31, 2021, but was defeated both times due to assistance from Jey Uso and Paul Heyman. On the second night of WrestleMania 37 on April 11, Owens defeated Sami Zayn and attacked Logan Paul after the match. At Hell in a Cell on June 20, Owens lost to Zayn. After a brief hiatus, Owens returned on the July 2 episode of SmackDown, defeating Zayn in a Last Man Standing match to qualify for the Money in the Bank ladder match at Money in the Bank. At the event on July 18, Owens failed to win the contract as it was won by Big E.

As part of the 2021 Draft, Owens was drafted to the Raw brand. On the November 1 episode of Raw, Owens entered a storyline with WWE Champion Big E and Seth Rollins after Big E hit the Big Ending on Owens after their non-title match. The following week, Owens attacked Big E after the former's match against Rollins, turning heel for the first time since 2019. Owens attacked Finn Bálor the next week, cementing his heel turn. On the November 29 episode of Raw, Owens defeated Big E by disqualification to be added to the WWE Championship match at the Day 1 pay-per-view, making it a triple threat match. At Day 1 on January 1, 2022, Owens was unsuccessful in capturing the title as Bobby Lashley and Brock Lesnar were also added to the match and Lesnar won the title. On the March 7 episode of Raw, Owens and Rollins failed to capture the Raw Tag Team Championship in a triple threat tag team match against RK-Bro and Alpha Academy. Later that night, Owens announced that he was hosting "The KO Show" at WrestleMania 38 and invited "Stone Cold" Steve Austin to be the guest, who accepted the invitation the next day. In the main event on the first night of WrestleMania 38 on April 2, Owens revealed that the invitation to the show was a ruse and challenged Austin to an impromptu No Holds Barred match, which Austin accepted, 19 years after his retirement. Following his loss to Austin, Owens was escorted out of the stadium by Dallas police officers.

On the following episode of Raw, Owens, who admitted he made a mistake by challenging Austin to a match, was interrupted by a clean shaven Elias, who claimed to be Elias’ younger brother Ezekiel. In the following weeks on Raw, Owens entered a feud with Ezekiel after refusing to believe he was really Elias's brother, and thought he was actually Elias himself. On the May 23 episode of Raw, Owens challenged Ezekiel to a match at Hell in a Cell, which he accepted. At the event on June 5, Owens defeated Ezekiel. On the August 8 episode of Raw, Owens stretchered Ezekiel out of the arena after attacking him with an Apron Powerbomb, a move he had not used in years, thus ending their feud. This would be the final appearance of the Ezekiel character in the WWE, as he would go back to performing under the Elias gimmick afterwards.

Return of the Prizefighter (2022–present)
The following week on Raw, having not held a championship in WWE for over five years, Owens said it was time to bring back the "Prizefighter". On the August 22 episode of Raw, with his old titantron and duct tape "KO" tank top, he answered an open challenge by Alpha Academy and defeated Chad Gable before fending off an attack from Gable and Otis afterwards, turning face in the process. On the September 19th Raw Owens would receive help from Johnny Gargano during his match with Austin Theory, leading to a backstage argument with Alpha Academy where Owens and Gargano would accept a challenge by Gable for a tag team match the following week. On the next weeks Raw Owens and Gargano, who had named themselves the Panda Express during their time on the indies despite not actually teaming together, would defeat Alpha Acedemy. At Survivor Series WarGames on November 26, Owens along with The Brawling Brutes (Sheamus, Ridge Holland and Butch) and Drew McIntyre lost to The Bloodline in a WarGames match. At the Royal Rumble on January 28, 2023, Owens again lost to Reigns in an Undisputed WWE Universal Championship match. After the Elimination Chamber main event, Owens saved Zayn from a beatdown from Reigns and Jimmy Uso. On the following episode of Raw, Zayn offered an olive branch to Owens and proposed that they team up to bring down The Bloodline together, but Owens rejected it. 

On the March 17, 2023, episode of SmackDown, Cody Rhodes invited Owens and Zayn to hash it out so that they can reunite to fight against The Bloodline, but Owens again declined to team up with Zayn. Later that night, Zayn confronted Jey Uso in the ring and was beaten up by The Usos. Owens ran out to save Zayn and embraced him.

Other media 
In 2012, Ring of Honor (ROH) released a two-disc set entitled Kevin Steen: Ascension to the Top, focusing on his first two years with the promotion, and Kevin Steen: Descent into Madness, covering his solo run from 2009 to 2010. In 2013, ROH released a DVD titled Kevin Steen: Hell Rising, which included both his best matches in the promotion and a shoot interview, in which Steen went into detail most notably about his relationship with Jim Cornette and his booking of ROH. The DVD was pulled from ROH's online store shortly after its release. It was made available again during the 2013 Christmas season. Following his departure, ROH released another three disc set entitled Thanks Steen Thanks, which featured matches from the end of his championship run through his final match with the company.

Owens is a playable character in the video games such as WWE 2K16, WWE 2K17, WWE 2K18, WWE 2K19, WWE 2K20,  WWE 2K22, and WWE 2K23.

Personal life 
Steen married Karina Lamer in 2007. They have a son named Owen (named after Owen Hart, with Steen dedicating his WWE ring name to both his son and Hart) and a daughter named Élodie Leila. At the end of the DDT4 Night One event in May 2008, Steen's then-six-month-old son appeared in a segment with Excalibur in which Excalibur called Steen's son "ugly", prompting Steen to perform three consecutive package piledrivers on him before placing his son on top of Excalibur for the pinfall.

Steen is a close friend of fellow Canadian wrestler Rami Sebei, currently known in WWE as Sami Zayn, with the pair's onscreen characters teaming up or feuding with each other various times since they first met in 2002.

Steen is a fan of Canadian country singer Shania Twain. The two met at her Montreal show in 2018, where he joined her on stage and she promised that she would sing her song "When" for him if he defeated his then-rival, Braun Strowman.

Championships and accomplishments 

 All American Wrestling
 AAW Heavyweight Championship (1 time)
 Capital City Championship Combat
 C4 Championship (1 time) 
 C4 Tag Team Championship (1 time) - with Mike Bailey 
 C4 Championship Tournament (2009)
 Combat Zone Wrestling
 CZW Iron Man Championship (1 time)
Elite Wrestling Revolution
EWR Heavyweight Championship (1 time, inaugural)
Elite 8 (2005)
EWR Championship Tournament (2004)
 International Wrestling Syndicate
 IWS Canadian Championship (1 time)
 IWS World Heavyweight Championship (3 times)
 North Shore Pro Wrestling
 NSPW Championship (1 time)
 Pro Wrestling Guerrilla
 PWG World Championship (3 times)
 PWG World Tag Team Championship (3 times) – with El Generico (2) and Super Dragon (1)
 Pro Wrestling Illustrated
 Ranked No. 3 of the top 500 singles wrestlers in the PWI 500 in 2017
 Quebec Wrestling Hall of Fame
 Class of 2017
 Ring of Honor
 ROH World Championship (1 time)
 ROH World Tag Team Championship (1 time) – with El Generico
 ROH World Championship No. 1 Contender Tournament (2008)
 Match of the Decade (2010s) 
 Rolling Stone
 Best Heel (2015)
 Best Promos (2015) 
 Best Storyline (2015) 
 Ranked No. 6 of the 10 best WWE wrestlers of 2016
 Rookie of the Year (2015)
 WWE Match of the Year (2015) 
 WWE Wrestler of the Half-Year (2015)
 SoCal Uncensored
 Match of the Year (2011) with Super Dragon vs. The Young Bucks on December 10
 Wrestler of the Year (2005, 2011, 2012)
 Sports Illustrated
 Ranked No. 7 of the top 10 wrestlers in 2017
 Wrestling Observer Newsletter
 Best Brawler (2010–2012)
 Feud of the Year (2010) 
 Squared Circle Wrestling
 2CW Heavyweight Championship (1 time)
 2CW Tag Team Championship (1 time) - with Jason Axe
 WWE
 NXT Championship (1 time)
 WWE Universal Championship (1 time)
 WWE Intercontinental Championship (2 times)
 WWE United States Championship (3 times)

Lucha de Apuesta record

References

External links 

 
 
 
 
 

1984 births
21st-century professional wrestlers
Anglophone Quebec people
Canadian expatriate professional wrestlers in the United States
Canadian male professional wrestlers
Canadian people of French descent
French Quebecers
Living people
NWA/WCW/WWE United States Heavyweight Champions
NXT Champions
People from Saint-Jean-sur-Richelieu
Professional wrestling announcers
Professional wrestlers from Quebec
ROH World Champions
WWF/WWE Intercontinental Champions
WWE Universal Champions
ROH World Tag Team Champions
PWG World Champions
PWG World Tag Team Champions
CZW Iron Man Champions
AAW Heavyweight Champions